Black Rain is the second album by Dark Lotus. It peaked at No. 3 on the Billboard Top Independent Albums chart and No. 71 on the Billboard 200.

Track listing

Chart positions
Billboard 200 – 71
Independent Albums – 3

References 

2004 albums
Dark Lotus albums
Psychopathic Records albums